Our Lady of Czestochowa Parish - designated for Polish immigrants in Turners Falls, Massachusetts, United States.

Founded 1909, it is one of the Polish-American Roman Catholic parishes in New England in the Diocese of Springfield in Massachusetts. The architect for the church was Donat R. Baribault of Springfield, MA

References

Bibliography 
 
 The Official Catholic Directory in USA

External links 
 Our Lady of Czestochowa - Official Website 
 Our Lady of Czestochowa - Diocesan Information
 Our Lady of Czestochowa - ParishesOnline.com
 Diocese of Springfield in Massachusetts

Roman Catholic parishes of Diocese of Springfield in Massachusetts
Polish-American Roman Catholic parishes in Massachusetts